Tatton is a constituency in Cheshire represented in the House of Commons of the UK Parliament since 2017 by Esther McVey, a Conservative.

Constituency profile 
Tatton comprises the north-western part of the Cheshire East unitary authority, including the towns of Knutsford and Wilmslow, and a number of villages such as Alderley Edge, Chelford, Handforth and Mobberley, in Cheshire.  It also covers a small, north-east, part of the Cheshire West and Chester unitary authority, including some of the outskirts of Northwich.

The seat largely comprises prosperous villages and small towns, many of which have high property prices, set amidst Cheshire countryside, featuring country parks, hills, recreation grounds and golf courses. The area was previously dominated by countryside; however, since the 1950s, it has developed a largely built-up, suburban character, being located on the fringes of Greater Manchester. The largest centres of population are Alderley Edge, Wilmslow and Knutsford. Its proximity to Manchester means Tatton forms part of the commuter belt to the city.

Workless claimants, registered jobseekers,  were in November 2012 lower than the national average of 3.8%, at 2.1% of the population based on a statistical compilation by The Guardian.

During the 2016 EU membership referendum, the constituency voted to remain in the EU, despite both Cheshire East and Cheshire West and Chester voting to leave overall. The margin was 55.56% Remain over 44.44% Leave.

Creation 
The constituency was created for the 1983 general election following the major reorganisation of local authorities under the Local Government Act 1972, which came into effect on 1 April 1974. It was formed from parts of the seats of Runcorn, Cheadle, Northwich and Knutsford. The constituency is named after Tatton Park, a stately home in this area.

Boundaries 

1983–1997: The Borough of Macclesfield wards of Dean Row, Fulshaw, Handforth, High Legh, Hough, Knutsford Nether, Knutsford Over, Knutsford South, Knutsford West, Lacey Green, Mere, Mobberley, Morley and Styal, and Plumley; and the District of Vale Royal wards of Barnton, Castle, Cogshall, Lostock Gralam, Marston and Wincham, Northwich, Rudheath and Whatcroft, Seven Oaks, Shakerley, Winnington, Witton North, and Witton South.

Initially comprised the towns of Northwich and Knutsford and surrounding rural areas, formerly parts of the abolished constituencies of the same names, together with the former Urban District of Wilmslow, previously part of the constituency of Cheadle. Also included a small area transferred from Runcorn.

1997–2010: The Borough of Macclesfield wards of Alderley Edge, Dean Row, Fulshaw, Handforth, High Legh, Hough, Knutsford Nether, Knutsford Over, Knutsford South, Knutsford West, Lacey Green, Mere, Mobberley, Morley and Styal, Nether Alderley, and Plumley; and the District of Vale Royal wards of Barnton, Cogshall, Lostock Gralam, Marston and Wincham, Rudheath and Whatcroft, Seven Oaks, and Shakerley.

Under the Fourth Periodic Review of constituencies, the number of constituencies in Cheshire was increased from 10 to 11 and Northwich was now included in the newly created constituency of Weaver Vale. To compensate for this loss, Alderley Edge was transferred from Macclesfield.

2010–2019: The Parliamentary Constituencies (England) Order 2007 defined the boundaries as:

The Borough of Macclesfield wards of Alderley Edge, Chelford, Dean Row, Fulshaw, Handforth, High Legh, Hough, Knutsford Bexton, Knutsford Nether, Knutsford Norbury Booths, Knutsford Over, Lacey Green, Mere, Mobberley, Morley & Styal, and Plumley; and the Borough of Vale Royal wards of Barnton, Cogshall, Lostock & Wincham, Rudheath & South Witton, Seven Oaks & Marston, Shakerley.

Minor changes due to revision of ward boundaries.

However, before the new boundaries came into force for the 2010 election, the districts making up the county of Cheshire were abolished on 1 April 2009, being replaced by four unitary authorities. Consequently, the constituency's boundaries became:

The Cheshire East wards of Alderley Edge, Chelford, Handforth, High Legh, Knutsford, Mobberley, Wilmslow Dean Row, Wilmslow East, Wilmslow Lacey Green, and Wilmslow West & Chorley ; and the Cheshire West and Chester wards of Marbury, Shakerley, and Witton & Rudheath (part).

2019–present: Following a further local government ward boundary review in 2019, the boundaries are currently:

The Cheshire East wards of Alderley Edge, Chelford, Handforth, High Legh, Knutsford, Mobberley, Wilmslow Dean Row, Wilmslow East, Wilmslow Lacey Green, and Wilmslow West & Chorley ; and the Cheshire West and Chester wards of Davenham, Moulton & Kingsmead (part), Marbury (part), Rudheath (part), and Shakerley.

Political history 
The constituency was initially held in 1983 by the Conservative Neil Hamilton.

During the 1997 general election campaign, Tatton was one of the UK's highest-profile constituencies. Following Hamilton's implication in the Cash for Questions scandal of the 1990s, the Labour Party and the Liberal Democrats withdrew their candidates in favour of the former BBC journalist Martin Bell, who stood as an Independent, while those two parties supported his "anti-corruption" campaign. Bell was ultimately successful, with a majority of 11,077. Hamilton came second.

Having promised to serve only one term, Bell did not contest the seat at the 2001 election, and the seat was won by Conservative George Osborne with a majority of 8,611 (20.8%). Osborne held the seat at the 2005 election with an increased majority, and became the Shadow Chancellor that year. He held the position of Chancellor of the Exchequer from 2010 to 2016, one of the highest frontbench government positions. Osborne served the seat until standing down at the 2017 election, having been announced as the new editor of the London Evening Standard newspaper in March of that year.

Esther McVey, who had been MP for nearby Wirral West from 2010 to 2015, was elected in 2017. McVey was the Secretary of State for Work and Pensions after Theresa May's Cabinet reshuffle in January 2018, but resigned after concerns over May's plan of leaving the European Union in November 2018. McVey subsequently announced her candidacy for the Conservative Party leadership in 2019, but was knocked out in the first round, receiving the lowest number of votes of all ten candidates.

Members of Parliament

Elections

Elections in the 2010s

Elections in the 2000s

Elections in the 1990s 

1997(new boundaries)

Elections in the 1980s

See also 

 List of parliamentary constituencies in Cheshire
History of parliamentary constituencies and boundaries in Cheshire

Notes

References

Sources 

 Data for the 2005 election are from the BBC.
 Data for the 2001 election are from United Kingdom Election Results.
Data for the 1997 and 1992 results are taken from The Guardian.
 Data for 1983 and 1987 elections taken from Politicsresources.net - Official Web Site ✔

Parliamentary constituencies in Cheshire
Constituencies of the Parliament of the United Kingdom established in 1983
Borough of Cheshire East
Knutsford